Secreto de confesión may refer to:
 Secreto de confesión (film), the first Filipino film in the Spanish language
 Secreto de confesión (1965 TV series), a Mexican telenovela
 Secreto de confesión (1980 TV series), a Mexican telenovela